Slunj (Hungarian Szluin, old German Sluin, Latin Slovin, archaic Croatian Slovin grad)  is a town in the mountainous part of Central Croatia, located along the important North-South route to the Adriatic Sea between Karlovac and Plitvice Lakes National Park, on the meeting of the rivers Korana and Slunjčica. Slunj has a population of 1,674, with a total of 5,076 people in the municipality (2011) and is the cultural and social center of the region of Kordun in the vicinity to Bosnia and Herzegovina. Administratively, the town is part of Karlovac County. Slunj is an underdeveloped municipality which is statistically classified as part of the First Category Area of Special State Concern by the Government of Croatia.

History  
An old fortification of the Frankopans, built during the wars against the Turks, Slovin was first mentioned in the 12th century. The old fort was property of the Frankopan (Hungarian Frangepán) family since the 15th century, joined by an old Franciscan monastery from the same period. Later, this town has been called Slunj. In the 16th century the town was ravaged by the Ottoman wars and turned into a military outpost of the Croatian Military Frontier, but by the end of the 17th century the settlement was rebuilt into the Slunj as it exists today. The castle has been developed to a fortress and served as headquarters for the commanding general of this area (see Stari grad Slunj). After the Treaty of Sistova in 1791 people increasingly began to re-settle in this area.

During the short French governance period from 1809 until 1813, Slunj encountered an economic boom as streets, storage facilities and mills were built and as vineyards and mulberry trees were planted. At this point of time, the Croatian language has become official language of the country. The residence of the former governor general of the French Illyrian Provinces, marshal Auguste de Marmont, still exists.

The town of Slunj was first mentioned in a written document by the chronicler Johann Weikhard von Valvasor who reported about the fortified town of Slunj, a bridge and a mill in 1689. The first illustration of the mills of Rastoke dates back from 1789. It was a copper engraving that has been added to a description by Belsazar Hacquet. At the end of the 19th century, Stjepan Širola wrote the following about this place: "The surroundings of Slunj are downright romantic […]. They are crowned by the magnificent waterfalls of the Slunjčica river by which even not outspoken nature lovers will be captivated. Indeed, Slunj with its romantic surroundings and the silver waterfalls of the Slunjčica represent a true nature gem astonishing even to foreigners."

Until 1918, Slunj (named SZLUIN) was part of the Austrian monarchy (Kingdom of Croatia-Slavonia, Modruš-Rijeka County, after the compromise of 1867), in the Croatian Military Frontier.  It was administered by the SZLUINER Grenz-Infanterie-Regiment  N°IV before 1881. Slunj became a district capital in the Modruš-Rijeka County in the Kingdom.

The Cazin uprising of 1950, an armed anti-state rebellion of peasants, which mostly affected the Bosnian towns Cazin and Velika Kladuša, also affected Slunj to a lesser extent. All of the cities were a part of Communist Yugoslavia at the time. Peasants revolted against the forced collectivization and collective farms by the Yugoslav government on the farmers of its country. Following a drought in 1949, the peasants of Yugoslavia were unable to meet unrealistic quotas set by their government and were punished. The revolt that followed the drought resulted in the killings and persecution of those who organized the uprising, but also many innocent civilians. It was the only peasant rebellion in the history of Cold War Europe.

In 1963, the Austrian writer Heimito von Doderer published the novel The Waterfalls of Slunj which features a climactic sequence set in this locality. During the 20th century scientific research studies were carried out in the Slunj area and particularly its Rastoke district. During the 19th century and at the beginning of the 20th century Rastoke has been the center of social life in this region. With the development of the electric mill and massive emigration after the Second World War the economic significance of the mills in Rastoke has declined drastically.

Places of interest 
Slunj is famous for its little waterfalls and the well-preserved corn mills (dating back to the 18th century) in the picturesque lower part of the town, called Rastoke (referring to the branching of the rivers). At Slunj, the Slunjčica river (also called “Slušnica“ by local people) flows over several waterfalls and cascades into the Korana river. Here is also the location of the 22 water mills of Rastoke.

Population

As of 2011, most of Slunj's population is Croatian (87.9%) followed by Serbs (10.5%) and a small number of other ethnic groups.

Settlements
The settlements in the Town of Slunj is:

 Arapovac, population 4
 Bandino Selo, population 6
 Blagaj, population 27
 Bukovac Perjasički, population 3
 Crno Vrelo, population 7
 Cvijanović Brdo, population 2
 Cvitović, population 279
 Čamerovac, population 57
 Donja Glina, population 28
 Donja Visočka, population 9
 Donje Primišlje, population 35
 Donje Taborište, population 200
 Donji Cerovac, population 129
 Donji Furjan, population 59
 Donji Kremen, population 47
 Donji Lađevac, population 46
 Donji Nikšić, population 204
 Donji Poloj, population 11
 Donji Popovac, population 20
 Dubrave, population 21
 Glinsko Vrelo, population 43
 Gornja Glina, population 144
 Gornja Visočka, population 16
 Gornje Primišlje, population 13
 Gornje Taborište, population 227
 Gornji Cerovac, population 94
 Gornji Furjan, population 85
 Gornji Kremen, population 65
 Gornji Lađevac, population 58
 Gornji Nikšić, population 47
 Gornji Popovac, population 176
 Grobnik, population 20
 Jame, population 28
 Klanac Perjasički, population 6
 Kosa, population 15
 Kosijer Selo, population 5
 Kutanja, population 2
 Kuzma Perjasička, population 11
 Lađevačko Selište, population 11
 Lapovac, population 35
 Lumbardenik, population 141
 Mali Vuković, population 115
 Marindolsko Brdo, population 59
 Miljevac, population 10
 Mjesto Primišlje, population 49
 Novo Selo, population 68
 Pavlovac, population 35
 Podmelnica, population 199
 Polje, population 29
 Rabinja, population 0
 Rastoke, population 50
 Salopek Luke, population 17
 Sastavak, population 14
 Slunj, population 1,674
 Slunjčica, population 7
 Snos, population 8
 Sparednjak, population 3
 Stojmerić, population 3
 Šlivnjak, population 17
 Točak, population 70
 Tržić Primišljanski, population 20
 Veljun, population 112
 Veljunska Glina, population 17
 Veljunski Ponorac, population 12
 Videkić Selo, population 21
 Zapoljak, population 8
 Zečev Varoš, population 23

Sport

Football 
Although Slunj is very small, it has many sport clubs. Most famous are the football club NK Slunj and MNK Drenak.  There are two football fields in Slunj. One is situated in the center of Slunj and popularly called Gradsko igralište (Town field) and the other is Zubac, which is the official turf of NK Slunj.

Koranski susreti 
On the last day of "Dani grada Slunja" (festivity called Days of the city of Slunj), which usually takes place at the beginning of August, games are organized on main swimming area on the river Korana. Participating teams compete in many games like swimming and snorkeling and many other.

Notable people 
Milan Neralić (famous fencer and winner of the Bronze Medal at the Olympic Summer Games in Paris in 1900

Twin towns 
 Castel San Giovanni, Italy
 Grude, Bosnia and Herzegovina

Mississauga, Canada

See also 
 Daniel Freiherr Peharnik-Hotkovich

Gallery

References

External links

 
 Slunj Tourist Board
 Cultural Tourism in Croatia. Church of the Holy Trinity in Slunj. (Croatian)

Cities and towns in Croatia
Populated places in Karlovac County
Modruš-Rijeka County